The Dead Eyes of London ( and also known as Dark Eyes of London) is a 1961 West German black and white crime film directed by Alfred Vohrer and starring Joachim Fuchsberger, Karin Baal and Dieter Borsche.

Plot
A series of murders of wealthy men leads investigators to a group of blind men with a mysterious leader.

Cast
 Joachim Fuchsberger as Inspector Larry Holt
 Karin Baal as Eleanor "Nora" Ward, née Finlay
 Dieter Borsche as David Judd aka Mr. Lennox aka Reverend (Paul) Dearborn
 Wolfgang Lukschy as Stephan Judd
 Eddi Arent as Sergeant / Inspector S. "Sunny" Harvey
 Anneli Sauli as Fanny Weldon (as Ann Savo)
 Bobby Todd as Lew Norris
 Franz Schafheitlin as Sir John
 Ady Berber as Jacob "The Blind Jack" Farrell (as Adi Berber)
 Harry Wüstenhagen as "Flimmer-Fred" (German version) / "Flicker-Fred" (English version)
  as Matthew "Matt" Blake
 Hans Paetsch as Gordon Stuart
 Ida Ehre as Ella Ward
  as Chief Inspector
 Klaus Kinski as Edgar Strauss

Production
The film is based on the 1924 novel The Dark Eyes of London by Edgar Wallace, which had been previously adapted into the 1939 British film The Dark Eyes of London, a.k.a. The Human Monster, introducing a number of horror elements which had not been in the original book. The British film had been released in Germany and proved to be popular. The German film is closer to being a remake of the earlier British film, rather than a close adaptation of Wallace's novel.

The Dead Eyes of London was the first Edgar Wallace film to be directed by Alfred Vohrer, who directed 13 more films in the genre.

Reception
The FSK gave the film a rating of "16 and up" and found it not appropriate for screenings on public holidays. The film premiered on 28 March 1961 at the "Walhalla" cinema in Wiesbaden. Author and film critic Leonard Maltin awarded the film two out of four stars, calling the film "[an] Acceptable thriller".

References

External links
 

1961 films
1960s mystery thriller films
German mystery thriller films
West German films
1960s German-language films
Remakes of British films
Films shot in Hamburg
German black-and-white films
Films directed by Alfred Vohrer
Films based on British novels
Films based on works by Edgar Wallace
Films set in England
Films set in London
Films produced by Horst Wendlandt
Films about blind people
1960s German films